Persatuan Sepakbola Indonesia Karanganyar, commonly known as Persika Karanganyar, is an Indonesian football club based in Karanganyar Regency, Central Java, Indonesia, and currently play in Liga 3.

History
Persika Karanganyar was established on 1965, before changing its name to Persika Karanganyar, the club was originally named Persatuan Sepakbola Makam or PSM. There were two names who at that time led the Karanganyar Regency. namely Daisman who led from February 1965 to August 1965 and Drs Harun Al Rasyid led from September 1965 to October 1965.

The beginning of the founding of this club originated from a group of People Youth who were very fond of playing football at that time. Since there was no adequate football field, these youths played on a mediocre field, close to the Hero's grave. Until finally they agreed to form a football association with the name PSM, The initial name was PSM, Persatuan Sepakbola Makam (Cemetery Football Association), because the game was played near the hero's grave.

In the era of Karanganyar Regent Leadership, R Soekardjono. PSM officially changed its name to Persika Karanganyar on 20 November 1967. Since it was officially founded, due to funding factors, the lack of funding has made this club not much involved in various football competitions in Indonesia. Until finally, in the 1980s, Persika Karanganyar managed to rise to the highest football caste in Indonesia. At that time, Persika Karanganyar qualified for the Galatama Division II.

References

External links
 

Football clubs in Indonesia
Football clubs in Central Java
Association football clubs established in 1965
1965 establishments in Indonesia